Yaakkai is a 2017 Indian Tamil romantic crime thriller film directed by Kuzhandhai Velappan, starring Krishna and Swathi Reddy in the leading roles. Featuring music composed by Yuvan Shankar Raja, the film was released on 3 March 2017.

Cast

Krishna as Kathir
Swathi Reddy as Kavitha
Prakash Raj as Sagayam
Radha Ravi as Krishnamurthy
Guru Somasundaram as Sriram
M. S. Bhaskar as Kathir's father
G. Marimuthu as Kavitha's father
Mayilsamy as Barfly
Singampuli as Muniyappan (Police)
Aathma Patrick as Melvin
Hari Krishnan as Noor

Production
In November 2013, Kuzhandhai Velappan and Kreshna announced that they would make a film titled Idhayam, and that the latter had purchased the title rights from the makers of the 1991 film of the same name. The film underwent a title change from Idhayam to Yaakkai in November 2014, after the team had shot for six days and had cast Prakash Raj as a police officer and Swathi Reddy as the heroine. The film was later put on hold until the completion of the lead pair's other ongoing project, Yatchan (2015).

The film then progressed throughout 2016, with Guru Somasundaram joining the cast to portray an antagonist in the film. Shoots were predominantly held in college campuses across Chennai, while scenes were also shot in Coimbatore, Ooty and Kothagiri. The film entered its post-production stages in July 2016, with Kreshna dubbing for his portions in a single day.

Soundtrack

Two songs from the film were released as promotional singles, prior to the release of the film's album. "Nee" sung by Yuvan Shankar Raja was released to coincide with Valentine's Day in 2016, while another song titled "Solli Tholaiyen Ma" sung by Dhanush was released during July 2016.

Critical reception

Sify wrote "Throughout the film, the director takes the audiences for granted with amateurish writing and execution. Except for the visuals and Yuvan’s score nothing really works.  To conclude, this is nothing but clumsy writing and execution."
New Indian Express wrote "Of about 127 minutes of viewing time, 'Yaakkai' is a monotonous journey, unexciting and uninteresting."
Behindwoods wrote "Kulandai Velappan’s writing is good and his idea to make a romantic crime thriller involving medical scam is commendable, as it is a road, not-much-taken. On the downside, the narration could have been much more effective and straightforward, which would have helped the film's engagement."
Baradwaj Rangan of Film Companion wrote "It comes and goes, and the only interesting aspect of the film, it turns out, is a trick built around the timeline of the narrative. But like everything else, it’s not pulled off well."

References

External links
 

Films scored by Yuvan Shankar Raja
2010s Tamil-language films
Indian crime thriller films
Medical-themed films
Films shot in Chennai
Films shot in Ooty
Films shot in Coimbatore
2017 crime thriller films
Romantic crime films